Dallas Area Rapid Transit (DART) is a transit agency serving the Dallas–Fort Worth metroplex of Texas. It operates buses, light rail, commuter rail, and high-occupancy vehicle lanes in Dallas and twelve of its suburbs.

DART was created in 1983 to replace a municipal bus system and funded expansion of the region's transit network through a sales tax levied in member cities.

DART jointly operates the Trinity Railway Express commuter rail line between Dallas and Fort Worth, with Trinity Metro. The agency also operates the Dallas Streetcar and provides funding for the non-profit McKinney Avenue Streetcar.

History

Precursor agencies 
The Dallas Transit System (DTS) was a public transit service operated by the city of Dallas, from 1964 to 1983. DTS was formed by the consolidation of various privately owned transit companies and streetcar lines. Prior to DTS, the company was formerly known as the Dallas Railway and Terminal Company when Dallas had an extensive streetcar system that spanned from Oak Cliff to North Dallas. The name was changed shortly after the last streetcar ran in January 1956. DART formally took over operations of the DTS in 1988.

In 2000, DART employees restored a 1966 DTS bus to its original state.

Creation of DART 
DART was created on August 13, 1983, as a regional replacement for the DTS (Although the name "Dallas Area Rapid Transit" was intended to reflect the new agency's coverage of the greater Dallas–Fort Worth metroplex, its acronym DART almost immediately evoked comparisons to San Francisco's Bay Area Rapid Transit system, known as BART). Citizens of 15 area cities had voted to levy a 1% sales tax to join the system by the time it began transit services in 1984 (though the formal acquisition of the Dallas Transit System wouldn't be complete until 1988).

In 1985, member cities Carrollton and Farmers Branch held elections to pull out of DART, though the measures failed.  But shifting suburban politics and a loss of confidence in DART management after voters declined to support DART's measure to incur long term debt in 1988 led to seven more pullout votes, two of which (Flower Mound and Coppell) were successful. Just one suburb joined DART – the tiny community of Buckingham, which was later annexed by DART member city Richardson.

Financial scandal 
In December 2007, DART revealed it was facing a $1 billion shortfall in funds earmarked for the Blue Line rail service to Rowlett and Orange Line rail service to Irving, and the DFW Airport.

In January 2008, DART announced it would divert monies from rail lines being built in Dallas. When Dallas officials protested, DART president and executive director Gary Thomas—who had known about the shortfall for at least eight months—announced the agency would borrow more money.

In late January 2008, DART Board chair Lynn Flint Shaw, who was also treasurer of Dallas Mayor Tom Leppert's "Friends of Tom Leppert" fund-raising committee, resigned from her DART post. In February, she surrendered to the police on charges of forgery. On March 10, Shaw and her husband, political analyst Rufus Shaw, were found dead in their home in what turned out to be a murder suicide.

2016 shooting 

On July 7, 2016, one DART officer was among several people shot in a mass shooting targeting police officers providing security at a Black Lives Matter protest. One of the officers, identified as seven-year veteran Brent Thompson, died from his injuries and became the first DART officer to be killed in the line of duty since the department's inception.

DART Light Rail 

With 43,400 weekday boardings in 2020, DART Light Rail had the 5th highest ridership of light rail systems in United States. The system uses light rail trains manufactured by Kinki Sharyo, with all trains being converted to "Super" LRVs (SLRVs) which feature level boarding (especially convenient for strollers and wheelchairs) and higher passenger capacity.

After the election, the plan was pared down to  when Duncanville, Grand Prairie and Mesquite, which would have had rail lines, opted to not join the agency. DART chose light rail transit as its primary mode of rail transportation in 1984. The plan was pared down again to  before the 1988 bond vote.

The following lines are maintained by DART:
  (Opened in 1996, completed in its current state in 2002)
  (Opened in 1996, completed in its current state in 2016)
  (Opened in 2009, completed in its current state in 2010)
  (Opened in 2012, completed in its current state in 2021)
 Silver Line (Approved for construction in 2006, planned opening in 2024)

Streetcars

McKinney Avenue Transit Authority 

DART also assists in the operation of the M-line Trolley, with a joint operating subsidy given to the McKinney Avenue Transit Authority along with the Uptown Improvement District.

Dallas Streetcar 

In May 2013, DART began construction on a  streetcar line which will operate between downtown Dallas and Oak Cliff by way of the Houston Street Viaduct.  Phase one of the streetcar line, running between Union Station in Dallas and Methodist Dallas Medical Center in Oak Cliff, opened on April 13, 2015.  The line was expanded to its current length in August 2016 with the addition of the 6th Street and Bishop Arts stops.

Commuter rail

Trinity Railway Express 

The  (TRE) commuter rail line connects downtown Dallas with downtown Fort Worth. The TRE, created in 1996 by an interlocal agreement between DART and Trinity Metro, connected the cities' centers by rail for the first time since the 1930s, excluding Amtrak's Texas Eagle.

The TRE commuter line has an average weekday ridership of 7,300 passengers per day and is the fifteenth most-ridden commuter rail system in the country. In 2012, the TRE carried a total of 2.3 million passengers.

Silver Line 

The Silver Line is an under-construction commuter rail service that will run from Dallas/Fort Worth International Airport to Plano along the former Cotton Belt route. It is expected to commence service in 2024.

DCTA A-train 

The Denton County Transportation Authority (DCTA) built its A-train commuter rail service in partnership with DART and the TRE. The DCTA leases the right-of-way for its  commuter line from DART, and coordinates with DART to provide connecting service between the A-train and DART's Green Line. The DCTA also leased Budd diesel rail cars from the TRE for its initial service.  The A-train operates between downtown Denton and Trinity Mills station, where a transfer to the Green Line is available. Through its partnerships with DART and TRE, DCTA sells "Regional" fare passes which include access to DART and TRE service.

Buses 

As of 2022, DART operates 74 fixed-regular bus routes and several circular and shuttle routes. There are 21 local routes, which serve downtown Dallas. Some locals link the suburbs with downtown Dallas. There are 6 express routes which ferry passengers between two areas with limited or no stops in between. These use HOV lanes on freeways when possible. Most of the routes link the suburban neighborhoods of DART to transit centers and rail stations with a dozen of those running crosstown, but they don't serve Downtown Dallas.

Most trips in the DART system are carried by the bus system. In the 1st quarter of 2010, DART had 125,500 bus trips per average weekday out of a total of 194,700 trips.

DART numbers its bus routes according to the type of route:
 Local routes, serving downtown, suburban areas, rail stations, and crosstown: 1–251
 15–30 minute–frequency: 1–114
 30–60 minute–frequency: 200–251
 Express routes, limited-stop service using larger vehicles with reclining seats: 300s (with the exception of the Mesquite COMPASS operated by STAR Transit, designated as route 201)

In addition to the above regular fixed routes, DART will also contract with its neighbors or businesses and run circulators, like the Southern Methodist University or NorthPark Center circulators or shuttles for Texas Instruments or UT Southwestern Medical Center. These shuttle routes—circular or otherwise—are given numbers in the 400 range (with the exception of route 883)

DART runs its bus system similar to the hub and spoke model some airlines use. DART has several bus-only facilities, which include transit centers, transfer centers, transfer locations, and Park & Rides.

DART has 7 transit centers, which are:
 Addison Transit Center in Addison, a future rail station on the Cotton Belt in the 2030 plan
 J. B. Jackson Transit Center in Dallas
 Lake Ray Hubbard Transit Center in Garland
 Downtown Irving/Heritage Crossing Station in Irving
 North Irving Transit Center in Irving
 Red Bird Transit Center in Dallas
 South Garland Transit Center in Garland
 Jack Hatchell Transit Center in Plano

The DART bus system has five transfer locations/centers:
 Bernal/Singleton Transfer Location in Dallas, a possible future rail station on the west rail line toward Grand Prairie in DART's 2030 plan
 Cockrell Hill Transfer Location in Cockrell Hill
 East Transfer Center in downtown Dallas
  Malcolm X Boulevard Transfer Location in South Dallas
 West Transfer Center in downtown Dallas

Finally, DART has two Park and Ride locations:
 Glenn Heights Park and Ride in Glenn Heights
 Northwest Plano Park and Ride off the Dallas North Tollway just north of Spring Creek Parkway in Plano

In addition, to make transfers easier, most rail stations are hubs for DART buses.

In October 2012, DART introduced a new fleet of 14 to 17-passenger buses for its on-call & Flex services, and beginning on October 22, some select bus routes that are less-traveled. Beginning in 2013, DART would replace most of bus fleet with NABI 40LFW buses running off CNG fuel. Voted unanimously, by state government to rapidly revise to a clean-air fleet over their existing diesel buses.

On-Call service 
Prior to the bus and rail changes on October 6, 2003, DART has launched its premium on-call shuttle service to replace many low-productive DART bus routes. It was first opened in some North Dallas and Plano neighborhoods and, in late 2005, it expanded to Glenn Heights in Northern Ellis County. DART On-Call operated on weekdays only (except on holidays).

The On-Call service served north central Plano, eastern Rowlett, Farmers Branch, North Dallas, Lakewood, Richardson, Lake Highlands, and Glenn Heights.

Flex service 

DART introduced a new service into its system called a "Flex" service in 2008. It is similar to DART On-Call but combines the advantages of a fixed bus route along with curbside pickup. It used a local fare on stops at fixed routes and/or a premium fare on curbside pickups and dropoffs within the Flex zone if time permits. Customers in those areas who desired a pickup at a specific location would do so by calling DART one hour before their destination time or at stop. The DART Flex service would be replaced by GoLink during 2021.

The Flex service served the following areas:
 East Plano (replaced routes 570, 760, and DART On-Call East Plano.)
 Garland/Rowlett (replaced route 557.)
 Pleasant Grove (replaced route 842.)
 South Irving (Clockwise/Counter-clockwise. Replaced portions of routes 302 & 306)
 South Plano (to replace busiest portions of Telecomm Corridor Flex Service during peak hours.)
 Telecomm Corridor (Bi-directional, weekday rush hours only) (replaced portions of route 316)

GoLink 
Sometime in 2021, DART replaced much of their On-Call and Flex routes (as well as less-traveled routes on January 24, 2022) with GoLink, DART's new on-demand transportation service. Using a variety of vehicles and service providers, GoLink delivers on-demand DART service within a designated zone. Each GoLink zone provides service to a rail station or transit center, for connections to other DART services. Hours of operation vary by zone.

Customers who wish to book a trip may do so through DART's GoPass app or calling the phone number listed. GoLink does not accept cash, paper passes or vouchers, but they do accept credit or debit cards or the GoPass tap card.

GoLink serves the following areas:

Northwest zones 
Cypress Waters
Farmers Branch
Keller Springs
Northwest Carrollton
Northwest Dallas
Preston Hollow
Western Carrollton

Northeast zones 
Central Richardson
East Plano
East Telecom
Far North Plano
Legacy West
North Central Plano/Chase Oaks
South Central Plano

Eastern zones 
Rowlett
Southeast Garland
Lake Highlands
Lakewood

Southern zones 
Glenn Heights
Inland Port
Inland Port Connect Zone
Kleberg
Rylie
South Dallas

Western zones 
Central Irving
East Irving
Mountain Creek
South Irving
West Dallas

Central zones 
Lake Highlands
Lakewood
North Dallas
Park Cities
South Dallas

Ridership and financial performance 
Average daily ridership for DART has been in the vicinity of 200,000 riders per day over the last couple decades. In the 1st quarter of 1998, DART's weekday ridership averaged 211,000 riders per day system-wide.  Ridership has risen and fallen since then; total ridership, including  ridership, has been as high as 248,500 average weekday riders in the 3rd quarter of 2008, and as low as 194,700 average weekday riders in the 1st quarter of 2010.  However, after a year-long study in 2012 that counted passenger counts through both the existing manual method and a new automated counting system, DART concluded it has been underreporting rail ridership by more than 15 percent each year. In the 4th quarter of 2012, DART reported an average weekday ridership of 252,900. In the fourth quarter of 2014, DART reported total ridership had declined to 233,900 weekday riders. During popular sporting events, many locals from the suburbs of Dallas use the DART to and from downtown, especially since the highways often get congested.

Overall, DART is one of the lowest-performing transit systems in the U.S., when measured against comparable peer cities, for number of passenger trips, operating cost per mile, and fare recovery rate.  In 2016, in addition to rider's fare payments, taxpayers paid $5.90 for each trip taken.  In late 2021, DART increased its debt by $1 billion.

Member cities 
In addition to the cities that voted to join DART at its creation, the legislation that created DART specifies any city adjoining Dallas may join the agency.  In addition, any city that adjoins a DART member city becomes eligible to join.  Member cities fund DART with a 1% sales tax.  This levy prevents some cities from joining, due to Texas laws that cap the total sales tax that may be charged.

In 2003, the Texas Legislature enacted new legislation enabling countywide transit districts in areas adjacent to major metropolitan areas (such as the Denton County Transportation Authority), but DART's membership rules were not affected.

List of DART member cities 
In addition to the city of Dallas, the following cities are also DART members:
 Addison
Addison planned a vote to withdraw from DART but cancelled the measure in January 1990.
 Carrollton
Carrollton voted to remain a DART member in January 1985 by a 69–31 percent margin, again voted in August 1989 to remain a member, and yet again voted to remain a member in August 1996 by a 77–23 percent margin.
 Cockrell Hill
 Farmers Branch
Farmers Branch voted to remain a DART member in January 1985 by a 61–39 percent margin, and again voted in November 1989 to remain a member.
 Garland
Garland voted to remain a DART member in November 1989 and again in January 1996 (the latter by a 2–1 margin).
 Glenn Heights
Glenn Heights is the only suburb in the southern section of the Dallas area that is a DART member (although Cockrell Hill is also in the southern section, it is technically an enclave of Dallas).
 Highland Park
 Irving
Irving voted to remain a DART member in August 1989, and again voted to remain a member in August 1996 by a 57–43 percent margin.
 Plano
Plano voted to remain a DART member in August 1989, and again voted to remain a member in August 1996 by a 77–23 percent margin.
 Richardson
Richardson annexed the former city of Buckingham in 1996; Buckingham was (and remains) the only city to join DART subsequent to the 1983 charter election.  Also, Buckingham planned a withdrawal vote but cancelled it in July 1989.
 Rowlett
Rowlett voted to remain a DART member in August 1989, and again voted to remain a member in August 1996 by a 67–33 percent margin.
 University Park

All the suburbs listed joined DART as charter members in 1983 (except for Buckingham, no other cities have joined DART subsequent to 1983, and two cities later withdrew as shown below).  Glenn Heights is the only suburb which, had it not joined DART in 1983, would be ineligible for membership today, as it does not border either Dallas or another DART member city.

Original cities that declined DART 
The cities of Duncanville, Grand Prairie, Lancaster, Mesquite, The Colony, and Wilmer had a proposal to join DART on the ballot in 1983, but voters declined to join.  The Colony is the only suburb in the northern portion of Dallas which declined to join DART, yet is still eligible to join, as it borders Carrollton, a DART member.  (The Colony is also eligible to join DCTA, as it is in Denton County.)  Wilmer is no longer eligible to join DART, as it is not bordered by a DART member city.

Former DART member cities 
The cities of Coppell and Flower Mound were original members of DART.  However, after voters in the DART service area rejected a 1988 ballot measure plan which would have allowed DART to take on long-term debt, the cities placed measures on the 1989 ballot to withdraw from DART, and the voters approved the measures.

Coppell remains eligible to rejoin DART, as it borders three DART member cities (Dallas, Irving, and Carrollton).

Flower Mound is no longer eligible to rejoin DART as it does not border a DART member city.  Flower Mound voters were asked to join DCTA in 2003 but rejected that measure as well.

Eligible cities that are not members of DART 
These cities are eligible to join DART as they are adjacent to either Dallas or another DART member city, but have not chosen or are unable to levy the required 1% sales tax required for membership and regular service.  However, DART can establish service to non-member cities under certain conditions.  In addition to the Trinity Railway Express interlocal agreements, DART serves destinations like Eastfield College, which is within the city limits of non-DART member Mesquite.

Executive directors 
 Maurice Carter 1982–1984
 George Bonna (Interim) 1984–1985
 Ted Tedasco 1985–1986
 John Hoeft (Interim) 1986
 Charles Anderson 1986–1992
 Tony Venturato (Interim) 1992
 Jack Evans 1992
 Victor Burke (Interim) 1993
 Roger Snoble 1993–2001
 Gary Thomas 2001–2021
 David Leininger (Interim) 2021
 Nadine Lee  2021–Present

See also 

 List of Dallas Area Rapid Transit rail stations
 McKinney Avenue Transit Authority
 Light rail in the United States
 List of United States light rail systems by ridership
 List of tram and light rail transit systems
 Dublin Area Rapid Transit

References

External links 

 DART – official site
 DART – official site 
 System Map
 Expansion Plan Map
 DART History
 Transit-Oriented Development

 
Transportation in Dallas
Dallas–Fort Worth metroplex
Bus transportation in Texas
Passenger rail transportation in Texas
Light rail in Texas
Transportation in Dallas County, Texas
Transportation in Tarrant County, Texas
Transportation in Irving, Texas
Transportation in Plano, Texas